Priacanthus is a genus of marine ray-finned fishes belonging to the family Priacanthidae, the bigeyes. As of 2012 there are 12 species in the genus.

Species
The following species are classified within the genus Priacanthus:

Priacanthus alalaua Jordan & Evermann, 1903 - Alalaua
 Priacanthus arenatus Cuvier, 1829 -  Atlantic bigeye
 Priacanthus blochii Bleeker, 1853 - Paeony bulleye
 Priacanthus fitchi Starnes, 1988
 Priacanthus hamrur (Forsskål, 1775) - Moontail bullseye
 Priacanthus macracanthus Cuvier, 1829 - Red bigeye
  Priacanthus meeki Jenkins, 1903 - Hawaiian bigeye
 Priacanthus nasca Starnes, 1988
 Priacanthus prolixus Starnes, 1988 - Elongate bulleye
 Priacanthus sagittarius Starnes, 1988 - Arrow bulleye
 Priacanthus tayenus Richardson, 1846 - Purple-spotted bigeye
 Priacanthus zaiserae Starnes & Moyer, 1988
 † Priacanthus liui  Tao, 1993

† means extinct

Cladogram

Notes

References
Froese, R. and D. Pauly. Priacanthus. FishBase. 2015.
Catalogue of Life

 
Priacanthidae
Taxa named by Lorenz Oken